The Hunter 29.5 is an American sailboat, that was designed by Rob Mazza and the Hunter Design Team and first built in 1994.

The design was developed into the Moorings 295 for the charter market in 1994.

Production
The boat was built by Hunter Marine in the United States between 1994 and 1997, but it is now out of production.

Design

The Hunter 29.5 is a small recreational keelboat, built predominantly of fiberglass. It has a fractional sloop rig, an internally-mounted spade-type rudder, a fixed fin keel and a walk-through transom design. It displaces  and carries  of ballast.

The boat is fitted with a Japanese Yanmar diesel engine.

The boat has a PHRF racing average handicap of 189 with a high of 198 and low of 183.

See also
List of sailing boat types

Related development
Hunter 336

Similar sailboats
C&C 30
Cal 29
Catalina 30
CS 30
Hunter 30
Hunter 30T
Hunter 30-2
Hunter 306
Island Packet 29
Kirby 30
Mirage 30
Mirage 30 SX
Nonsuch 30
Pearson 303
Southern Cross 28

References

External links

Official brochure

Keelboats
1990s sailboat type designs
Sailing yachts
Sailboat types built by Hunter Marine
Sailboat type designs by Rob Mazza
Sailboat type designs by Hunter Design Team